The pygmy hanging parrot, red-billed hanging parrot or green hanging parrot (Loriculus exilis) is a tiny species of parrot in the family Psittaculidae.
It is endemic to forest, mangrove and other wooded habitats on the Indonesian island of Sulawesi. It is becoming rare due to habitat loss.

The bird is green all over. Its face consists of an orange bill and red throat. The tail is red. It is sometimes with the great hanging parrot. The pygmy hanging parrot is smaller and has a more red bill, green forehead, and uniform green mantle.

References

Pygmy hanging parrot
Endemic birds of Sulawesi
Pygmy hanging
Near threatened animals
Near threatened biota of Asia
Pygmy hanging parrot
Taxonomy articles created by Polbot